ISO 3166-2:WS is the entry for Samoa in ISO 3166-2, part of the ISO 3166 standard published by the International Organization for Standardization (ISO), which defines codes for the names of the principal subdivisions (e.g., provinces or states) of all countries coded in ISO 3166-1.

The abbreviation is derived from Western Samoa, the country's former name until 1997.

Currently for Samoa, ISO 3166-2 codes are defined for 11 districts.

Each code consists of two parts, separated by a hyphen. The second part is two letters.

Current codes
Subdivision names are listed as in the ISO 3166-2 standard published by the ISO 3166 Maintenance Agency (ISO 3166/MA).

Click on the button in the header to sort each column.

See also
 Subdivisions of Samoa
 FIPS region codes of Samoa

External links
 ISO Online Browsing Platform: WS
 Districts of Samoa, Statoids.com

2:WS
ISO 3166-2
Samoa geography-related lists